Arrecina Tertulla (died in 62 or 63) was a Roman woman who lived in the 1st century. She was the first wife of Titus and mother of his daughter Julia Flavia.

Biography

Early life
Tertulla came from an Equestrian-rank family of obscure origin. Her mother was Julia Ursa and her father was Marcus Arrecinus Clemens, who served as Emperor Caligula's praetorian prefect in 38 A.D. Tertulla's brother Marcus Arrecinus Clemens also served as a praetorian prefect in 70 under the Emperor Vespasian.

Her name "Tertulla", is a nickname for the female cognomen Tertia.

Marriage
In 62 Tertulla married Vespasian's first son, the future Emperor Titus. This marriage could have been arranged by the fathers of Tertulla and Titus, to promote Titus' political and military career, and to provide financial relief from the debt incurred by Vespasian's proconsulship. She bore Titus his first child, Julia Flavia. The marriage did not last long, as Tertulla was either divorced or dead by 63, when Titus married for the second time to Marcia Furnilla.

References

Sources 
 Suetonius, The Twelve Caesars - Titus

60s deaths
1st-century Roman women
Tertulla
Flavian dynasty
Titus
Wives of Roman emperors